The Pratt & Whitney XH-3130 (sometimes called the XL-3130) was an H-block aircraft engine project developed for the United States Navy in the late 1930s. The design was later enlarged as the XH-3730), but the project was canceled in 1940 in favor of Pratt & Whitney developing the R-4360 Wasp Major air-cooled radial engine.

Specifications

See also

References

Notes

Bibliography

External links
 Photo of the XH-3730 at enginehistory.org

XH-3130
Sleeve valve engines
1940s aircraft piston engines
Abandoned military aircraft engine projects of the United States